Punta Manara is the end of a promontory in the Gulf of Tigullio between the Ligurian towns of Sestri Levante and Riva Trigoso in the Province of Genoa, Italy. It has been subject to environmental protection since 1977.

Punta Manara is a popular destination for tourists from Italy and from all over the world. Located at the southeast of the Gulf of Tigullio, it offers glimpses of the coast and many plant and animal species that inhabit the maquis shrubland.

It is a strategic site, and an excellent maritime lookout location.

The northern slopes of Punta Manara collect water which flows into Rio Ravino, which crosses the main path to the headland. Although small, it collects water from several tributaries and is a used for irrigating vegetables and olive trees around the village of Ginestra.

Punta Manara can only be reached by paths that climb the promontory above Sestri Levante. A nature trail on the promontory has signs that describe the plants that can be seen. There is a municipal campsite near the end of the promontory.

Flora 

Plant species on the headland include Arbutus unedo (strawberry tree), samphires, myrtle, cistus, erica arborea (tree heath), mastic and broom. Tree species include black alder, holm oak, cork oak and maritime pine.

Landforms of Liguria
Headlands of Italy
Tourist attractions in Liguria